Don Bies (born December 10, 1937) is an American professional golfer who has won tournaments on the PGA Tour, the Senior PGA Tour (now known as the Champions Tour), and in the Pacific Northwest Section of the PGA of America.

Born in Cottonwood, Idaho, Bies attended Ballard High School in Seattle, Washington, and turned pro in 1957. His only PGA Tour win came at the 1975 Sammy Davis Jr.-Greater Hartford Open. His best finish in a major was a T-5 at the 1968 U.S. Open that was played at Oak Hill Country Club in Rochester, New York. Bies is a three-time winner of the Washington Open (stroke play) and a six-time winner of the Washington State Match Play Championship and has won a host of other events in the Pacific Northwest. He left the PGA Tour in 1980 in order to devote full-time to his restaurant he had opened just outside Seattle.

After turning 50 at the end of 1987, Bies joined the Senior PGA Tour, where his fortunes improved dramatically for winning tournaments. He has won numerous events both on the regular Senior PGA Tour and in non-Tour senior events. These wins include a senior major championship – The Tradition at Desert Mountain in 1989.

Bies was elected a member of the Pacific Northwest PGA Hall of Fame in 1994.

Professional wins (30)

PGA Tour wins (1)

PGA Tour playoff record (1–0)

PGA Tour of Australasia wins (1)

Other wins (15)
this list may be incomplete
1959 Washington Open
1961 Washington State Match Play
1962 Northwest Open
1963 Washington State Match Play
1964 Washington State Match Play
1965 Washington State Match Play
1967 Pacific Northwest PGA Championship
1968 Washington State Match Play
1980 Washington Open, British Columbia Open
1983 Washington State Match Play
1984 Northwest Open
1987 Washington Open, PNW PGA Al Guisti Memorial
1988 PNW PGA Al Giusti Memorial

Senior PGA Tour wins (7)

Senior PGA Tour playoff record (0–1)

Other senior wins (6)
1989 DuPont Cup (Japan vs. U.S. Senior Golf Match)
1990 Chrysler Cup
2002 Washington State PGA Senior Invitational
2003 Washington State PGA Senior Invitational
2004 Pacific Northwest Senior PGA Championship, Oregon Senior Open

Champions Tour major championships

Wins (1)

References

External links

American male golfers
PGA Tour golfers
Ballard High School (Seattle, Washington) alumni
PGA Tour Champions golfers
Winners of senior major golf championships
Golfers from Idaho
People from Cottonwood, Idaho
1937 births
Living people